Joseph Armstrong Farm is a registered historic building near Fredericksburg, Ohio, listed in the National Register on 1978-11-27.

Historic uses 
Single Dwelling
Agricultural Outbuildings

Notes 

Farms on the National Register of Historic Places in Ohio
National Register of Historic Places in Holmes County, Ohio